Nicholas Sneathen (Snethen) (November 15, 1769 Long Island, Province of New York - May 30, 1845 Princeton, Indiana) was an American farmer, itinerant preacher, minister, and church leader.

Sneathen served as chaplain of the US House of Representatives and was a founder of the Methodist Protestant Church in the United States.  He was referred to as  “my silver trumpet” by Rev. Francis Asbury,

Early years 
Sneathen was born to Barak Snethen and Ann Weeks on November 15, 1769 in Fresh Pond, a settlement near present day Glen Cove, New York. Barak Snethen was an officer in the American militia during the French and Indian War and participated in the Montreal Campaign.

Nicholas Sneathen helped his father and grandfather in various family businesses during his youth. At various times, his family operated a schooner, ferrying people and goods around New York harbor, farming operations on both Long Island and Staten Island, and milling services in New Jersey.  Sneathen attended a country school and was instructed in religious matters by his mother, who came from a Quaker family, and his father, whose family belonged to the Dutch Reformed Church. Sneathen first professed religion to a Bishop in the Episcopal Church at age 18, but he soon converted to Methodism.

Ministry 
While upgrading his education, Sneathen served as the first Methodist class leader in the Old Sands Street Methodist Episcopal Church in Brooklyn, New York.  He was accepted into the Methodist Ministry in September, 1794 at age 25. For the next four years, Sneathen served the church followers in remote rural areas of Connecticut, Vermont and Maine.  He returned to New York in 1798, 

From 1798 to 1800  Sneathen ministered in Charleston, South Carolina.  In 1800, he was ordained an Elder at a regional Methodist conference there at age 31.  That same year, he traveled with Asbury to the General (National) Conference of Methodists in Baltimore. 

After the conference, Sneathen stayed in Baltimore. While there, he met Susannah Hood Worthington, whom he married 1804.  The couple then moved to New York, where Sneathen served as senior preacher. In 1806, the couple moved back to his wife's farm in Linganore, Maryland, 

Living in Lignanore, Sneathen preached in Baltimore, Georgetown and Alexandria, Virginia. In 1811, he was appointed Chaplain to the US House of Representatives. During this assignment, Sneathen met Henry Clay of Kentucky and John Randolph of Virginia.

Church schism 
From at least 1800 onward, the Methodist Church in America was divided over the question of how much authority the congregants should have to select their own preachers, and how much authority preachers should have to select their own assignments, rather than leaving the authority to make these decisions solely in the power of the church's bishops. 

Sneathen always took the Republican side, favoring power over these decisions being vested in the laity and ministers rather than the bishops. Eventually the Methodist Church divided over this issue, one side becoming the Methodist Episcopal Church and the other the Methodist Protestant Church. Mr. Snethen was one of the founding fathers of the Methodist Protestant Church.

Although his views on lay representation were opposed to those of Asbury, the two men remained on good terms. Sneathen delivered a eulogy of Asbury following the latter's death in 1816. That same year,  Snethen ran for a seat in the U S House of Representatives from the Third Congressional District of Maryland on the Federalist party ticket, but lost the election.

Later years 
In 1829, financial reversals and moral compulsions led Sneathen and his wife to sell their farm in Maryland and emancipate their slaves. The family moved to Merom, Indiana, . A year and a half later both Snethen's wife and one of his daughters were dead, probably from milk sickness caused by snakeroot poisoning

After his wife's death, Sneathen returned to itinerant preaching for the church, traveling extensively. He went back to New York for a time and lived in Louisville, Kentucky and Cincinnati, Ohio for extended periods. 

In 1844 Sneathen was called to preside over the new Snethen School for Young Ministers in Iowa City, Iowa.  While there, he officiated as Chaplain to the Iowa State Territorial Legislature during its session that year.   he was then named headmaster of the school

In 1845, while traveling from Cincinnati to Iowa, he stopped in Princeton, Indiana to visit his two daughters.  After a short illness, Sneathen died there on May 30, 1845 at age 75.  He was buried next to his wife and three of their children in Warnock Cemetery.

References 

 A Concise History of the Methodist Protestant Church from Its Origin: Embracing the Circumstances of the SUSPENSION of the Northern and Western Conferences in 1858, the Entire Career of the Methodist Church, and the REUNION of the Two Branches in 1877. With Biographical Sketches of Several Leading Ministers of the Denomination. By ANCEL H. BASSETT, WITH AN INTRODUCTION BY WILLIAM COLLIER, D.D. Published in Pittsburgh by the Press of Charles A Scott and by James Robison of Springfield, Ohio in 1877.
 History of Methodist Reform: Synoptical of General Methodism 1703 to 1898 With Special and Comprehensive Reference To Its Most Salient Exhibition In the History of the Methodist Protestant Church: By EDWARD J. DRINKHOUSE, M.D., D.D. (Eighteen Years Editor of “The Methodist Protestant”): Volume I. Published by the Board of Publication of the Methodist Protestant Church: Wm. J. C. Dulany, Agent, Baltimore, MD. & F. W. Pierpont, Agent, Pittsburgh, PA. 1899.
Sermons of the Late Nicholas Snethen, Minister of the Gospel in the Methodist Protestant Church. Written by Himself in the Sixty-Ninth Year of His Age. Edited by Worthington G. Snethen, Counsellor at Law. Second Edition. Washington, D.C. Published by Ulysses Ward, 1846.
Old Sands Street Methodist Episcopal Church of Brooklyn, N. Y. An Illustrated Centennial Record, Historical and Biographical. By Rev. Edwin Warriner, Corresponding Secretary of the New York East Conference Historical Society. With An Introduction by The Rev. Albert S. Hunt, D. D. Published for the Author by Phillips & Hunt, New York, 1885.
 IOWA CITY A Contribution to the Early history of Iowa. By Benjamin F. Shambaugh, M. A. Published by the State Historical Society of Iowa, Iowa City, Iowa, 1893.
Annals of the American Pulpit: Methodist: Commemorative Notices of Distinguished Clergymen of the Methodist Denomination in the United States from Its Commencement until the Close of the Year 1855 with an Historical Introduction by William Buell Sprague. Entered According To An Act of Congress in the Year 1856 By Robert Carter & Brothers In the District Court of the United States For the Southern District of New York.
Pelletreau, William S., Abstracts of Wills on File in the Surrogate's Office, City of New York, published as Collections of the New York Historical Society (Vol. XIII, 1784–86 and Letters of Administration 1785, published 1904), page 251 (will of Deborah Snethen). See also www.the.wardells@gte.net by Pat and Walter Wardell, Englewood, FL.
 The Papers of Alexander Hamilton, Volume 12 by Harold C. Syrett, page 55.
 The Black Code of the District of Columbia, in Force September 1, 1848 by Worthington G. Snethen. Published for the A. & F. Anti-Slavery Society by William Harned, 61 John St., New York, 1848.
 No Party Now: Politics in the Civil War North by Adam I. Smith.
 The Collected Works of Abraham Lincoln, Volume 7 by Abraham Lincoln. Owned by Foreman M. Lebold, Chicago, IL. Page 75.

1769 births
1845 deaths
American Methodist clergy
Chaplains of the United States House of Representatives
Religious leaders from New York (state)